Campanula americana, the American bellflower, or tall bellflower, is a bellflower native to eastern North America. Tall bellflowers can be annual or biennial with a varying life-history with seeds germinating in the fall producing annual plants and spring-germinating seeds producing biennial plants. Long-tongued bees are the primary pollinators, including Megachile campanulae, but halictid bees, butterflies, and skippers may also act as pollinators. Tall Bellflowers do not generally self-pollinate. Some authorities, including the USDA PLANTS database, consider the name Campanulastrum americanum to be the accepted name for this species.

Description

Morphology 
A large central flower stem shoots up from a basal rosette, that terminates in a raceme 1/2-2' long, with the plant's overall height being 3-6'.  The central stem is light green, slightly grooved, and hairy. The primary root system is a taproot. It has alternate leaves 3-6" in length, that are lance-shaped to ovate-elliptic in shape, with rough/toothed edges.

Tall bellflower flowers are light blue to violet with a pale white ring at the throat, which primarily bloom in July and August. It is an unusual bellflower in that its flowers are flat. Flowers are approximately 1" across. Its pistils have a recurved style and a three lobed anther and each flower has 5 stamen, 5 petals, and 5 sepals. The ovaries develop into 5 angled flat topped seed pods.

Distribution and habitat 
Tall bellflowers grow from the Great Lakes region south to Florida and from the Dakotas east to New York. They thrive in partial shade and grow along woodland edges, in open woods, shaded meadows, streambanks and ditches.

References

americana
Flora of North America
Plants described in 1753
Taxa named by Carl Linnaeus